KNRX (96.5 FM) is a commercial radio station located in Sterling City, Texas, broadcasting to the San Angelo, Texas area. KNRX airs a mainstream rock music format branded as "96.5 The Rock".

External links
San Angelo's KNRX 96.5 hosting The Bob & Tom Show

NRX
Radio stations established in 1998
Townsquare Media radio stations